Colin Campbell, 3rd Earl of Argyll (c. 1486 – 9 October 1529) was a Scottish nobleman and soldier. He was also known as "Cailen Malloch".

Life
Colin Campbell was the son of Archibald Campbell, 2nd Earl of Argyll and Lady Elizabeth Stuart, daughter of John Stewart, 1st Earl of Lennox. In 1506/07, he married Lady Jean Gordon, the eldest daughter of Alexander Gordon, 3rd Earl of Huntly by his first wife, Lady Jean Stewart. He succeeded as Earl of Argyll upon the death of his father on 9 September 1513.

Campbell led an army against the insurrection of various Highland chieftains; a few years later, he joined the court of King James V of Scotland. He was given the position of Lord Warden of the Marches, and in 1528, Lord Justice General of Scotland. He died on 9 October 1529, and was buried at Kilmun Parish Church in Cowal, Scotland.
 
Colin Campbell was succeeded by his son, Archibald Campbell. The Campbell family resided at Castle Campbell, near Dollar, Clackmannanshire, Scotland.

Family
Children of Colin Campbell, 3rd Earl of Argyll and Lady Jean Gordon:
 Archibald Campbell, 4th Earl of Argyll (d. bt 21 August 1558 – 2 December 1558), married three times.
 John Campbell, 1st of Lochnell (d. 13 May 1568), was killed at the Battle of Langside. 
 Lady Elizabeth Campbell (d. c. 1548), married: firstly, James Stewart, 1st Earl of Moray, an illegitimate son of King James IV of Scotland; secondly, John Gordon, 11th Earl of Sutherland
 Lady Agnes Campbell (b. 1526, d. 1601), married: firstly, James MacDonald, 6th of Dunnyveg; secondly, Sir Turlough Luineach O'Neill of Tír Eoghain, Ireland.

Campbell's sister, Lady Catherine Campbell, survived a murder attempt by her husband, Lachlan Maclean of Duart, in 1527. Maclean rowed out to Lady's Rock in the Firth of Lorne one night at low tide and left his wife stranded.

Ancestry

See also 
 Agnes Campbell

References

Sources

3
1480s births
1529 deaths
Scottish soldiers
16th-century Scottish landowners
C
16th-century Scottish peers